Clément M. Côté (born 19 October 1940 in Saint-Cœur-de-Marie, Québec) was a Progressive Conservative party member of the House of Commons of Canada. He was a sales manager by career.

Côté was elected at the Lac-Saint-Jean electoral district in the 1984 federal election.  He resigned part way through his term in the 33rd Canadian Parliament to permit Lucien Bouchard to enter federal politics.

External links
 

1940 births
Living people
Members of the House of Commons of Canada from Quebec
Progressive Conservative Party of Canada MPs